The Pyinyaung bent-toed gecko (Cyrtodactylus pyinyaungensis) is a species of gecko that is endemic to Myanmar.

References 

Cyrtodactylus
Endemic fauna of Myanmar
Reptiles of Myanmar
Reptiles described in 2017